The Corporal of Bolsena dates from a Eucharistic miracle in Bolsena, Italy, in 1263 when a consecrated host began to bleed onto a corporal, the small cloth upon which the host and chalice rest during the Canon of the Mass. The appearance of blood was seen as a miracle to affirm the Roman Catholic doctrine of transubstantiation, which states that the bread and wine become the Body and Blood of Christ at the moment of consecration during the Mass. Today the Corporal of Bolsena is preserved in a rich reliquary at Orvieto in the cathedral. The reddish spots on the cloth, upon close observation, show the profile of a face similar to those that traditionally represent Jesus Christ. It is said that the miraculous bleeding of the host occurred in the hands of an officiating priest who had doubts about transubstantiation. The "Miracle of Bolsena" is regarded by the Roman Catholic Church as a private revelation, meaning that Catholics are under no obligation to believe it although they may do so freely.
 
Pope Urban IV makes no mention of it in the bull by which he established the feast of Corpus Christi, although the legend of the miracle is set in his lifetime and is claimed by its partisans to have determined him in his purpose of establishing the feast. The contemporary biographers of Urban are silent: Muratori, Rerum Italicarum scriptores, (vol. III, pt. l, 400ff) and  Thierricus Vallicoloris, who, in his life of the pope in Latin verse, describes in detail all the events of the pontiff's stay at Orvieto, referring elsewhere also to the devotion of Urban in celebrating the Mass, and to the institution of the Feast of Corpus Christi, without at any time making allusion to a miracle at Bolsena.

The miracle of Bolsena is related in the inscription on a slab of red marble in the church of St Christina, and is of later date than the canonization of St. Thomas Aquinas (1328). The oldest record of the miracle is in the enamel representations of it that adorn the front of the reliquary 
made by Sienese goldsmith Ugolino di Vieri in 1337–1338.

In 1344 Clement VI, referring to this matter in a brief, uses only the words propter miraculum aliquod ("on account of some miracle") (Pennazzi, 367); Gregory XI, in a brief of 25 June 1337, gives a short account of the miracle; and abundant reference to it is found later (1435), in the sermons of the Dominican preacher Leonardo Mattei of Udine ("In festo Corp. Christi", xiv, ed. Venice, 1652, 59) and by Antoninus of Florence (Chronica, III, 19, xiii, 1), the latter, however, does not say (as the local legend claims) that the priest doubted the Real Presence of Christ in the Holy Eucharist, but, merely that a few drops from the chalice fell upon the corporal. For the rest, similar legends of the "blood-stained corporal" are quite frequent in the legend collections of even earlier date than the fourteenth century, and coincide with the great Eucharistic polemics of the ninth to the twelfth centuries.

The Feast of Corpus Christi is one of the major public holidays for the city of Orvieto, during which the Corporal of Bolsena is paraded around the city with much fanfare.

The left half of a large fresco in the Apostolic Room of the Vatican Palace, titled The Mass at Bolsena, was painted by the Renaissance painter Raphael.

Because of its red pigmentation, caused by expression of the dye prodigiosin, and its ability to grow on bread, S. marcescens has been proposed as a naturalistic explanation of medieval accounts of the "miraculous" appearance of blood on the Corporal of Bolsena.

References

External links
"Orvieto", article from The Catholic Encyclopedia

Relics associated with Jesus
Mythological objects
1263 in Europe